Vladimír Svitek (19 October 1962 – 17 February 2020) was a Slovak professional ice hockey player who played in the Czechoslovak First Ice Hockey League, Finnish Liiga, and Slovak Extraliga. Svitek was drafted in the seventh round of the 1981 NHL Entry Draft by the Philadelphia Flyers, but he never played professionally in North America. He spent the first ten seasons of his playing career with HC Košice and his final ten seasons in various European leagues.

References

External links

1962 births
2020 deaths
Czechoslovak ice hockey right wingers
Dunaújvárosi Acélbikák players
EK Zell am See players
Ferencvárosi TC (ice hockey) players
HC Košice players
HK Spišská Nová Ves players
HK 2016 Trebišov players
HPK players
Philadelphia Flyers draft picks
Slovak ice hockey right wingers
Sportspeople from Košice
Czechoslovak expatriate sportspeople in Finland
Czechoslovak expatriate sportspeople in Austria
Czechoslovak expatriate ice hockey people
Expatriate ice hockey players in Finland
Expatriate ice hockey players in Austria
Expatriate ice hockey players in Slovenia
Expatriate ice hockey players in Hungary
Slovak expatriate ice hockey people
Slovak expatriate sportspeople in Slovenia
Slovak expatriate sportspeople in Hungary